Shibanov is a Russian masculine surname, its non binary counterpart is Shibanova. It may refer to
Anna Shibanova (born 1994), Russian ice hockey defender
Tatyana Shibanova (born 1994), Russian ice hockey player, twin sister of Anna
Mikhail Shibanov, 18th century Russian painter 
Vasily Shibanov, a poem by Aleksey Tolstoy

Russian-language surnames